The Budapest Challenger was a professional tennis tournament played on outdoor red clay courts. It was the latter one of the two simultaneous challengers played in Hungary with the event taking place usually in September. It was part of the ATP Challenger Tour. It was held annually at the Római Teniszakadémia in Budapest, Hungary, from 1986 to 2005, when during the 2006 Hungarian floodings the courts were washed away and the event spot was replaced by the WOW Cafe Challenger. The most successful player was Sergio Roitman with three doubles titles.

Past finals

Singles

Doubles

Title sponsors
Fujitsu Siemens Open (2003, 2002)
Architect Open (2005, 2004, 2000)
Diego Open (2001)
Medicor Open (1999, 1998, 1997)

See also
Budapest Grand Prix
Budapest Challenger (May)
Stella Artois Clay Court Championships

References

External links
2005 Draw - ITF
2004 Draw - ATP
2003 Draw - ATP
2002 Draw - ATP
2001 Draw - ATP
2000 Draw - ATP
1999 Draw -ITF
1998 Draw - ITF
1997 Draw - ITF
1996 Draw - ITF
1995 Draw - ITF
1994 Draw - ITF
1993 Draw - ITF
1989 Draw - ITF

ATP Challenger Tour
Clay court tennis tournaments
Tennis tournaments in Hungary